Boca Juniors Confidential is an 2018 Argentinean docu-series, exploring the football team Boca Juniors at the coast of Argentina. It begins with the team's pre-season training, and ends with the final day of the season and team's championship race outcome, trying to win the Superliga again.

Premise
Boca Juniors Confidential explores the Argentinean football team Boca Juniors attempt at trying to win the Superliga again, interweening between on-pitch action and brief interviews.

Cast
 Juan Pablo Varsky
 Guillermo Barros Schelotto
 Lisandro Magallán
 Carlos Tevez
 Wanchope Ábila
 Daniel Angelici
 Gustavo Barros Schelotto
 Darío Benedetto
 Fernando Gago
 Nahitan Nández
 Cristian Pavón
 Pablo Pérez
 Guillermo Sara
 Walter Bou
 Edwin Cardona
 Carolina Castaño
 Frank Fabra
 Leonardo Jara
 Gonzalo Maroni

Release
It was released on September 14, 2018 on Netflix streaming.

References

External links
 

2018 Argentine television series debuts
2010s documentary television series
Spanish-language Netflix original programming